Yinka Davies (born July 16, 1970) is a Nigerian vocalist, dancer, lyricist and judge of reality show, Nigerian Idol. Yinka has been in the Nigerian entertainment industry for 28 years.

Pitch
Slogan – Time has come to speak up for ourselves

Background Information
Father – Benin Republic/Sierra Leone Lisabi clan who moved to Lagos because he was originally from Nigeria.

Mother – from Ikorodu, Lagos State.

Paternal grandmother -  from the Shagamu royal family

These origins affect her musical influences.  She remembers that her father had a guitar. She grew up to the sounds of Sam Cooke, Johnny Cash, Elvis and Jimmy Dean when she was growing up as this was the music that her father liked to listen to.

As Davies grew older in the 1970s and 1980s the radio at her grandmother's house was always tuned to Radio Lagos which played a variety of African music from Manu Dibango (Cameroun - Makossa), Mmaman Shatta (traditional Northern Nigerian musician), Dan Maria Jos (Northern Nigeria), Orlando Julius (southern Nigeria - highlife), Hadjia Funtua (northern Nigeria), Victor Uwaifo (southern Nigeria - Joromi), Fela (southern Nigeria - Afrobeat) to mention few.

She also remembers watching the late TV personality Art Alade (father of Dare Art-Alade) who had a popular television program called the Bar Beach Show featuring various musicians as well as his own resident band.  It became obvious to Yinka that there was a lack of female musicians - in the 1980s she listened to Salawa Abeni (Yoruba) and Dora Ifudu (popular musician in RnB genre) who was one of the female musicians that influenced her.

Foray into the word of Art and Music
Her first love was actually painting and sculpting; being a musician was not a priority for her initially. 
Easter Monday 1987 was the start of her journey into the arts when she visited the National Theatre in Lagos to explore becoming a visual artist. She went to meet Abiodun Olaku a renowned Nigerian painter. Her first love was actually painting and sculpting. She then got caught up in the ambiance of the national theatre.  She was later commissioned by the late Bassey Effiong (theatre director) to help him paint the stage for a production of Marriage of Anansewa by Efua Sutherland.  It was during this project that she experienced how her 2-dimensional painting dreams began to evolve with their own movement and could take on a life of their own.

During her visits to the National Theatre, being of an inquisitive nature, Yinka explored all the other venues in the complex to see what was going on and stumbled on Elizabeth Hammond (Ghanaian dancer) who held dance classes - she was her inspiration to become a dancer.  Elizabeth Hammond performed with the late Christie Essien Igbokwe Silver prize winner at 6th Seoul Songs Festival, South Korea in 1983.  As Yinka puts it, that was how she “gatecrashed” the various forms/areas of the arts.

Launch into music/singing
In 1992, the organisers of the Fame music award spotted her as an all-around artist from her work in theatre, video, choreography, background vocals for various Nigerian artist and nominated and gave her their first Upcoming artist award.

The management of a club in Lagos, Bread and Butter Jazz club involved her in the last presentation as a club in an effort to introduce a new renaissance artist called Lagbaja and she was heavily involved in the production of this artiste's first album called Side by Side which was released in 1993.  She subsequently concentrated more on music because this demanded more of her time.  It was during this period she also collaborated with Nigerian recording artists such as Mike Okri (RnB), Shina Peters (Afro juju), Blackky (Reggae) and many others not only as a backup vocalist but also a choreographer for their music videos.  Another great musician she worked with was the late Geraldo Pino (originally from Sierra Leone) and Etienne T Boy (Cameroonian) who worked with Pino.

January 21, 1994 was a major turning point as she, unfortunately, had a collision with a taxi in Lagos when crossing the road. In her words, she “crossed the road and hit a car”.  This resulted in major surgery which severely affected her ability to dance.  She was in between singing and dancing doing a lot of background vocals for other musicians.  Music to her was static in comparison with painting, sculpture, theatre, and dancing where she felt she could fuel her energy to its fullest.

The dearth of female musicians on the Nigerian music scene and Yinka's dedication to continuing her craft is that a woman must be seen, heard, respected and celebrated in Nigeria.  She wants to be remembered as a Nigerian who is constantly seen, heard and respected.  Consistency has been uppermost in her cause, she is determined to be a light, beacon, and example to the upcoming Nigerian female artiste and perhaps this is why she did not concentrate on breaking into the international scene until now.  Like a mother hen she wanted to be an inspiration to her female associates in the music industry and as these upcoming female musicians launch their careers she can now concentrate on her pursuit of breaking into the international scene.  To mention a few of the Nigerian female artists she regards as associates, even though they are not necessarily her contemporaries in the music industry, there are Asa, Tiwa Savage, Omawumi, Waje etc.

Yinka is a bridge from the old (where there were very few female musical role models) to the new Nigerian music scene where the female is asserting herself and claiming her rightful position.

Motivation
Family is a very strong motivator as she took on the responsibility of looking after her siblings at a very young age.

Her father was in the Nigerian Airforce so as a child they moved around a lot as her father was stationed in different parts of Nigeria.  She distinctly remembers a place called the 9th Mile which was the triangle point in Enugu where the road divided into 3 leading to the North, South, and East of the country.  The 9th Mile as a meeting point was, therefore, a potpourri of all cultures of Nigeria and because she was very inquisitive as a child she took on all these experiences as the family moved from military base to base this experience has also influenced her songwriting.

Discography

Albums
  work  (1998
 Emi n’lo (2002)
Black Chiffon (2010)

Collaborations
 I want to praise (Florocka)
 Lagbaja
 Fatai Rolling Dollar
 Alhaji Sikiru Ayinde Barrister

Notable Performances
 Alex O's Background Vocalist (1990-1992)
 World Music Day Organised by Alliance Francaise (1995 till date)
 Emi Nlo Album Listening by Carl Raccah (2000)
 Yinka Davies in Concert with *5 & 6* Band at the Alliance Francaise Lagos Nigeria (2013, 2014, 2016)
 Jazzville 7th Anniversary concert under direction of Elder Steve Rhodes
 1999-2002 – she was the resident act at the Nicon Nuga Hilton Hotel in the Nigerian capital city of Abuja.
 2006 performed with Tony Allen at The Cave during the release of his record Lagos No Shaking.
 African Film Festival Tour - Milan, Tunis, organised by The Goethe Institute.
 Black Chiffon Album Launch (2011)
 Nigerian Idol Judge (2011, 2012, 2013, 2014, 2016)
 Ajumogobia Science Foundation Concerts (2005-2015)
 African Music Festival - London (2015)
 Lagos State Jazz Festival (2016, 2017, 2018)
 Calabar State Jazz Festival (2017)
 Jazz at The United States Consulate's Residence (2015....)

Theatre/Stage
 Things Fall Apart directed by Bassey Effiong (1988)
 Lion and The Jewel directed by Bassey Effiong (1988)
 Contemporary Dance Troup led by Elizabeth Hammond (1988–90)
 Wind vs Polygamy directed by Sam Loco Efe (1989)
 Kakaki Concert: directed by Ben Tomoloju (1990)
 Death and The King's Horseman directed by Bayo Oduneye (1990)
 Greener Grass directed by Niji Akanni and Bakare (1990)
 Irara Alagbe directed by Felix Okolo (1992)
 Mekunu Melody by Felix Okolo (1992)
 Area Boy by Felix Okolo (1993)

Awards
 FAME music—Upcoming artiste of the year, 1992
 Nigeria Music Award (NMA)—Voice of the Decade, 2007.

References

External links
Official website

1970 births
Living people
Nigerian women musicians
Nigerian jazz musicians
World music musicians
Yoruba women musicians
Musicians from Lagos
20th-century Nigerian musicians
English-language singers from Nigeria
Yoruba-language singers
20th-century women musicians
21st-century women musicians
21st-century Nigerian singers